Augustus is a masculine given name derived from Augustus, meaning "majestic," "the increaser," or "venerable". Many of its descended forms are August,  Augusto, Auguste, Austin, Agustin and Augustine. The Greek translation of the title Augustus was Sebastos, from which the name Sebastian descends.

People named Augustus

By first name or title 
 Augustus (63 BC-14 AD), ancient Rome's first emperor
 Many other Roman emperors who bore this title
 Augustus I. Robbins (1839-1909), American Union Army soldier
 Augustus II the Strong (1670-1733), German King of Poland and Elector of Saxony
 Augustus III of Poland (1696-1763), German King of Poland and Elector of Saxony
 Augustus, Duke of Saxe-Gotha-Altenburg (1772-1822), German duke
 Augustus, Duke of Saxe-Lauenburg (1577-1656), German duke
 Augustus, Duke of Saxe-Weissenfels (1614-1680), German duke
 Augustus, Duke of Schleswig-Holstein-Sonderburg-Plön-Norburg (1635-1699), German duke
 Augustus, Elector of Saxony (1526-1586), German prince
 Augustus of Brunswick-Lüneburg, several people
 Augustus Abbott (1804-1867), British East India Company Army officer
 Augustus Huggins Abernathy (1838-1884), American physician
 Augustus Agar (1890-1968), British Royal Navy officer
 Augustus Aikhomu (1939-2011), Nigerian Navy officer
 Augustus Akinloye (1916-2007), Nigerian lawyer and politician
 Augustus Akiwumi (1891-1985), Nigerian-born Ghanaian politician, banker, judge, and scientist
 Augustus Alden (1837-1886), American politician
 Augustus Allen, several people
 Augustus Allhusen (1867-1925), English politician
 Augustus Alt (1731-1815), British soldier and Australian surveyor
 Augustus Anson (1835-1877), British Army personnel and Victoria Cross recipient
 Augustus Anwyl-Passingham (1880-1955), British soldier, recruiting officer, and Territorial Army organizer
 Augustus Applegath (1788-1871), English printer and inventor
 Augustus Arkwright (1821-1887), British Royal Navy officer and politician
 Augustus Armstrong (1833-1873), American lawyer and politician
 Augustus Bacon (1839-1914), American politician, Confederate soldier, and segregationist
 Augustus Baillie (1861-1939), Scottish businessman and British Army officer
 Augustus Baldwin, several people
 Augustus Bampfylde, 2nd Baron Poltimore (1837-1908), British politician
 Augustus Barber (1927-2008), American businessman
 Augustus Barrows (1838-1885), American lumberman, rancher, and pioneer settler
 Augustus Barry (1840-1871), Irish soldier
 Augustus Bartholomew (1882-1933), British librarian
 Augustus Bateman (1839-1922), English cricketer
 Augustus Beeby (1889-1974), English professional footballer
 Augustus Beekman (1923-2008), American fire commissioner
 Augustus Bennet (1897-1983), American politician
 Augustus Berkeley, 4th Earl of Berkeley (1715-1755), son of Vice-Admiral James Berkeley, 3rd Earl of Berkeley, and the former Lady Louisa Lennox
 Augustus Bickley (1857-1902), English journalist and author
 Augustus Bird (1802-1870), American pioneer and politician
 Augustus Blocksom (1854-1931), American Army officer
 Augustus Bourn (1834-1925), American politician
 Augustus Bouvier (1827-1881), French-born English painter
 Augustus Bove (?-1967), American politician
 Augustus Bowie Jr. (1872-1955), American inventor, businessman, and electrical engineer
 Augustus Bradford (1806-1881), American governor
 Augustus Brandegee (1828-1904), American lawyer and politician
 Augustus Bridle (1868-1952), Canadian journalist and author
 Augustus Brine (1769-1840), English Naval officer
 Augustus Buchel (1813-1864), German-born American military officer
 Augustus Buckland (1857-1942), British divine and writer
 Augustus Buell (1847-1904), American author
 Augustus Burbank (1823-1895), American physician
 Augustus Burke (1838-1891), Irish artist
 Augustus Caine (?-2005), Liberian academic and bureaucrat
 Augustus Carney (1870-1920), Irish-born American actor
 Augustus Case (1812-1893), American Naval officer
 Augustus Cavendish-Bradshaw (1768-1832), English politician
 Augustus Chase (1828-1896), American industrialist
 Augustus Chapman (1805-1876), American politician and lawyer
 Augustus Chetlain (1824-1914), American Army soldier
 Augustus Clark (1862-1928), English cricketer
 Augustus Dayton Clark (?-1990), American Naval officer
 Augustus Clevland (1754-1784), East India Company administrator, revenue collector, and judge
 Augustus Clifford (1788-1877), British Royal Navy 1st Baronet, MP
 Augustus Clissold (c. 1797–1882), English Anglican priest
 Augustus Constantine (1898-1976), American architect
 Augustus Cootmans, Belgian gymnast in the 1920s
 Augustus Corliss (1837-1908), American author and historian
 Augustus Crail (1842-1924), American pioneer, homesteader, cattle rancher, wheat strain developer, and politician
 Augustus Cutler (1827-1897), American politician
 Augustus Daniel (1866-1950), British curator and art museum director
 Augustus Davis (1835-1899), American Union Army officer
 Augustus de Bourbel (1835-1917), English cricketer
 Augustus De Butts (1770-1853), British Army officer
 Augustus Decker (1813-1872), American politician
 Augustus De Morgan (1806-1871), British mathematician and logician
 Augustus d'Este (1794-1848), British first known multiple sclerosis patient
 Augustus de Vaudricourt, French 19th-century painter and lithographer
 Augustus Dickens (1827-1866), English journalist and Charles Dickens’ brother
 Augustus Dill (1882-1956), American historian, activist, social worker, sociologist, and writer
 Augustus Dodge (1812-1883), American politician
 Augustus Dole (1816-1876), American businessman and optician
 Augustus Drum (1815-1858), American politician and lawyer
 Augustus Dumbar (born 1978), Liberian former footballer
 Augustus Dunbier (1888-1977), American painter
 Augustus Duncombe (1814-1880), English Anglican priest
 Augustus Earle (1793-1838), British painter
 Augustus Egg (1816-1863), British painter
 Augustus Endicott (1818-1910), American legislator and sheriff
 Augustus Ellis (1800-1841), British Army officer and Tory politician
 Augustus Elwood (1819-1881), American merchant and politician
 Augustus Everaerts (born 1929), Belgian former wrestler
 Augustus Farnham (1805-1865), American architect and Mormon missionary
 Augustus Fechteler (1857-1921), American Naval officer
 Augustus Fendler (1813-1883), Prussian-born American natural history collector
 Augustus Finkelnburg (1830-1889), German American immigrant, lawyer, politician, and pioneer
 Augustus FitzGeorge (1847-1933), British Army officer
 Augustus FitzGerald, 3rd Duke of Leinster (1791-1874), Anglo-Irish peer and freemason
 Augustus FitzRoy, several people
 Augustus Ford (1858-1931), English first-class cricketer
 Augustus Forsberg (1832-1910), Swedish military engineer
 Augustus Foster (1780-1848), British diplomat and politician
 Augustus Fox (1822-1895), English portrait painter
 Augustus Frank (1826-1895), American merchant, railroad executive, banker, and politician
 Augustus Fraser (?-1890), Australian politician and pastoralist
 Augustus Frazer (1776-1835), British Army officer
 Augustus Christian Frederick, Duke of Anhalt-Köthen (1769-1812), German prince
 Augustus French (1808-1864), American attorney and politician
 Augustus Fritsch (1866-1933), Australian architect
 Augustus Fuller, several people
 Augustus Gardner (1865-1918), American military officer and politician
 Augustus Garland (1832-1899), American lawyer and politician
 Augustus Garrett (1801-1848), American politician
 Augustus Gearhard (1893-1974), American Air Force brigadier general and Roman Catholic priest
 Augustus George (1817-1902), English cricketer
 Augustus George, Margrave of Baden-Baden (1706-1771), German Roman Catholic monarch and military personnel
 Augustus Gilchrist (born 1989), American professional basketball player
 Augustus Godson (1835-1906), British politician
 Augustus Goessling (1878-1963), American water polo player and swimmer
 Augustus Goetz (1904-1976), American rower
 Augustus Goodridge (1839-1920), Newfoundland merchant and politician
 Augustus Gough-Calthorpe, 6th Baron Calthorpe (1829-1910), British agriculturist and philanthropist
 Augustus Gould (1805-1866), American conchologist and malacologist
 Augustus Granville (1783-1872), Italian physician, writer, and patriot
 Augustus Greeves (1806-1874), Australian politician
 Augustus Gregoire (1936-1972), Dominican cricketer
 Augustus Gregory (1819-1905), English-born Australian explorer and surveyor
 Augustus Greulich (1813-1893), German-born American politician
 Augustus Griffin (1883-1946), American-born Canadian horticulture pioneer
 Augustus Radcliffe Grote (1841-1903), British entomologist
 Augustus C. Gurnee (1855-1926), American socialite and art patron
 Augustus M. Gurney (1895-1967), American Army officer
 Augustus Hall (1814-1861), American lawyer and politician
 Augustus Hamilton (1853-1913), New Zealand ethnologist, biologist, and museum director
 Augustus Hand, several people
 Augustus Noble Hand (1869-1954), American judge
 Augustus George Vernon Harcourt (1834-1919), English chemist
 Augustus Albert Hardenbergh (1830-1889), American politician
 Augustus Hare (1834-1903), English writer and raconteur
 Augustus Harris (1852-1896), British actor, impresario, and dramatist
 Augustus Glossop Harris (1825-1873), British actor and theatre manager
 Augustus L. Hart (1849-1901), American politician and jurist
 Augustus P. Hascall (1800-1872), American politician, surveyor, lawyer, and judge
 Augustus Hawkins (1907-2007), American politician
 Augustus George Hazard (1802-1868), American businessman and gunpowder manufacturer
 Augustus Helder (1827-1906), British solicitor and politician
 Augustus Hemenway (1853-1931), American philanthropist and public servant
 Augustus Hemming (1841-1907), British colonial administrator, governor, and cricketer
 Augustus Moore Herring (1867-1926), American aviation pioneer
 Augustus Hervey, 3rd Earl of Bristol (1724-1779), English Royal Navy officer and politician
 Lord Augustus Hervey (1837-1875), British politician
 Augustus Hewitt-Fox (1884-1959), South African cricketer
 Augustus High (1844–1927), American politician
 Augustus Hill (British Army officer) (1853–1921), British Army officer
 Augustus Charles Hobart-Hampden (1822–1886), English-born Ottoman admiral
 Augustus M. Hodges (1854–1916), American journalist, newspaper editor, poet, and political organizer 
 Augustus Holland (1824–1919), Canadian farmer and politician
 Augustus W. Holton (1850-1911), American architect
 Augustus Hooper (1814-1866), English-born Canadian merchant, timber dealer, and political figure
 Augustus Hopkins Strong (1836-1921), American Baptist minister and theologian
 Augustus Hopper (1816-1878), English Anglican priest
 Augustus Hoppin (1828-1896), American book illustrator
 Augustus Hotham (?-1896), Australian cricketer
 Augustus P. Hunton (1816-1911), American lawyer and politician
 Augustus Daniel Imms (1880-1949), English educator, research administrator, and entomologist
 Augustus Sol Invictus (born 1983), American political activist, attorney, blogger, and white nationalist
 Augustus Jackson (1808-1852), American confectioner, chef, and businessman
 Augustus James (1866-1934), Australian politician
 Augustus Jaspert (born 1979), British diplomat
 Augustus Jay (1850-1919), American diplomat
 Augustus Jessopp (1823-1914), English cleric and writer
 Augustus John (1878-1961), Welsh painter, draughtsman, and etcher
 Augustus S. Johnson, American politician
 Augustus Jones (c. 1757–1836), American-born Canadian farmer, land speculator, magistrate, militia captain, and surveyor
 Augustus D. Juilliard (1836-1919), American businessman and philanthropist
 Augustus Kargbo (born 1999), Sierra Leonean professional footballer
 Augustus Mbusya Kavutu (born 1977), Kenyan long-distance runner and marathoner
 Augustus Henry Keane (1833-1912), Irish Roman Catholic journalist and linguist
 Augustus M. Kelley (1913-1999), American book publisher
 Augustus Holmes Kenan (1805-1870), American politician and signer of the Confederate Constitution
 Augustus Kenderdine (1870-1947), English-born Canadian artist and farmer
 Augustus Keppel, several people
 Augustus Kilty (1807-1879), American Civil War Navy officer
 Augustus C. Kinney (1845-1908), American physician and scientist
 Augustus Braun Kinzel (1900-1987), American metallurgist and engineer
 Augustus Frederic Christopher Kollmann (1756-1829), German-born British composer and musical theorist
 Augustus Kountze (1826-1892), American businessman
 Augustus Koranteng Kyei (born 1990), Ghanaian blogger, freelance journalist, publicist, philanthropist, and digital marketer
 Augustus Leopold Kuper (1809-1885), British Royal Navy officer of German descent
 Augustus Osborne Lamplough (1877-1930), English Orientalist painter and illustrator
 Augustus Laver (1834-1898), Canadian architect
 Augustus Lawson (1930-?), Ghanaian sprinter
 Augustus Legge (1839-1913), English bishop
 Augustus Legge (archdeacon of Winchester) (1773-1828), English archdeacon
 Augustus Austen Leigh (1840-1905), English provost
 Augustus Asplet Le Gros (1840-1877), American poet and writer
 Augustus Le Plongeon (1825-1908), British-American archeologist and photographer
 Augustus Leveson-Gower (1782-1802), English Royal Navy soldier
 Prince Augustus Frederick, Duke of Sussex (1773-1843), English duke and George III's son
 Augustus Frederick Lindley (1840-1873), British Royal Navy officer, adventurer, and writer
 Prince Augustus Ferdinand of Prussia (1730-1813), Prussian prince and general
 Augustus Lochner (1827-1865), English soldier and cricketer
 Lord Augustus Loftus (1817-1904), British-Australian diplomat and colonial administrator
 Augustus Long (1904-2001), American businessman and Navy personnel
 Augustus V. Long (1877-1955), American district judge
 Augustus Nicodemus Lopes, Brazilian Christian theologian and minister
 Augustus Louis, Prince of Anhalt-Köthen (1697-1755), German prince
 Augustus Edward Hough Love (1863-1940), English mathematician
 Augustus Lowell (1830-1900), American industrialist, philanthropist, horticulturist, and civic leader
 Augustus Lucanus (1848-1941), Australian police officer and businessman
 Augustus Ludlow (1792-1813), American Naval officer
 Augustus Lunn (1905-1986), British artist and art teacher
 Augustus Nathaniel Lushington (1869-1939), Trinidad-born American veterinarian
 Augustus Macdonald (1804-1862), British politician and writer
 Augustus Rodney Macdonough (1820-1907), American lawyer, newspaper editor, and railroad secretary
 Augustus Magee (1789-1813), American Army soldier
 Augustus Maiyo (born 1983), Kenyan-born American long-distance runner
 Augustus Raymond Margary (1846-1875), British diplomat and explorer
 Augustus Martin, several people
 Augustus Matthiessen (1831-1870), British chemist and physicist
 Augustus Maxwell (1820-1903), American lawyer and politician
 Augustus Mayhew (1826-1875), English journalist and author
 Augustus McCloskey (1878-1950), American lawyer and judge
 Augustus Gardner Means (1925-1994), American businessman and politician
 Augustus Meredith Nanton (1860-1925), Canadian businessman, investor, and developer
 Augustus Merriman-Labor (1877-1919), Sierra Leonean barrister, writer, and munitions worker
 Augustus Summerfield Merrimon (1830-1892), American senator, lawyer, and judge
 Augustus Meyers (1841-1919), American Civil War soldier
 Augustus S. Miller (1847-1905), American mayor, lawyer, and politician
 Augustus Mongredien (1807-1888), British corn merchant, political economist, writer, and chess master
 Augustus Morris (1820-1895), Australian politician
 Augustus Newbold Morris (1838-1906), American hospital manager, animal care director, and bank vice-president
 Augustus Moulton (born 1959), Liberian sprinter
 Augustus Henry Mounsey (1834-1882), British diplomat
 Augustus Müller (1841-1910), German-born Indian Roman Catholic priest and missionary
 Augustus Edwin Mulready (1844-1904), English genre painter
 Augustus Nepean (1849-1933), English cricketer
 Augustus Neville, New Zealand-born Australian actor
 Augustus Charles Newman (1904-1972), British Army officer
 Augustus Norton, several people
 Augustus Richard Norton (1946-2019), American professor and army officer
 Augustus Henry Novelli (?-1887), English physician
 Augustus Nuwagaba (born 1964), Ugandan international economic transformation consultant
 Augustus Oga (born 1960), Kenyan boxer
 Augustus Frederick Oldfield (1821-1887), English botanist and zoologist
 Augustus Oldford (born 1925), Canadian former social worker, magistrate, and politician
 Augustus Orlebar (1897-1943), British military officer
 Augustus Orlebar (cricketer) (1824-1912), English first-class cricketer and clergyman
 Augustus Pablo (1953-1999), Jamaican roots reggae and dub record producer and a multi-instrumentalist
 Augustus Page (1855-1898), New Zealand cricketer
 Augustus Paget (1823-1896), British diplomat
 Augustus Paget (RAF officer) (1898-1918), British World War I flying ace
 Augustus G. Paine Jr. (1866-1947), American paper manufacturer and bank official
 Augustus G. Paine Sr. (1839-1915), American financier
 Augustus Parrish (born 1987), American former football player
 Augustus Paulet, 15th Marquess of Winchester (1858-1899), British peer and soldier
 Augustus Peirce (1840-1919), American sailor, actor, raconteur, and artist
 Augustus L. Perrill (1807-1882), American educator, law enforcement officer, and politician
 Augustus Peters (1931-1986), German clergyman and Roman Catholic bishop
 Augustus W. Peters (1844-1898), Canadian-born American politician and lawyer
 Augustus Herman Pettibone (1835-1918), American politician
 Augustus Phillimore (1822-1897), English Royal Navy officer
 Augustus Phillips (1874-1944), American actor
 Augustus Pierce (c. 1877–1934), American politician
 Augustus Pleasonton (1808-1894), American Civil War military general
 Augustus Poeppel (1839-1891), German-born Australian surveyor and explorer
 Augustus Pope, several people
 Augustus Porter (1769-1849), American businessman, judge, farmer, and politician
 Augustus Post (1873-1952), American adventurer, automotive pioneer, balloonist, early aviator, writer, actor, musician, and lecturer
 Augustus Prevost (1837-1913), British banker, businessman, and baronet
 Augustus Prew (born 1987), English film and television actor
 Augustus Prinsep (1803-1830), English artist, writer, and civil servant
 Augustus Pugin (1812-1852), English architect, designer, artist, and critic
 Augustus Charles Pugin (1762-1832), Anglo-French artist, architectural draughtsman, and writer
 Augustus Quirinus Rivinus (1652-1723), German physician and botanist
 Augustus Rauschenbusch (1816-1899), German Baptist clergyman
 Augustus M. Reinhardt (1842-1923), American businessman
 Augustus Rhodes (1821-1918), American judge, lawyer, and senator
 Augustus Ricardo (1843-1871), English cricketer
 Augustus J. Ricks (1843-1906), American judge
 Augustus Pitt Rivers (1827-1900), English officer in the British Army, ethnologist, and archaeologist
 Augustus Roberts, Canadian politician
 Augustus Robin, American engraver and businessman
 Augustus Rowe (1920-2013), Canadian physician and politician
 Augustus John Rush (born 1942), American psychiatrist
 Augustus M. Ryon (1862-1949), American mining engineer
 Augustus Saint-Gaudens (1848-1907), American sculptor
 Augustus Saunders (1801-1878), British school headmaster
 Augustus Saunders (baseball) (1909-1999), American professional baseball player
 Augustus Schell (1812-1884), American politician and lawyer
 Augustus Schoonmaker Jr. (1828-1894), American lawyer and politician
 Augustus Schutz (1689-?), English courtier of German descent
 Augustus Schwaab (1823-1899), German-American architect and civil engineer
 Augustus John Schwertner (1870-1939), American Roman Catholic bishop of German descent
 Augustus Sclafani (?-1986), American gangster of Italian descent
 Augustus Frederic Scott (1854-1936), Norwich-based architect
 Augustus Henry Seward (1826-1876), American Army soldier
 Augustus Seymour, several people
 Augustus Shapleigh (1810-1902), American businessman and pioneer
 Augustus Shears (1827-1911), English Anglican priest
 Augustus Burke Shepherd (1839-1885), English medical doctor
 Augustus Frederick Sherman (1865-1925), American clerical administrator and photographer
 Augustus Short (1802-1883), Australian bishop
 Augustus Siebe (1788-1872), German-born British engineer
 Augustus Constantine Sinclair (c. 1834–1891), Jamaican civil servant, historian, and non-fiction writer
 Augustus Smith, several people
 Augustus L. Smith (1833-1902), American educator, businessman, and politician
 Augustus Rhodes Sollers (1814-1862), American politician
 Augustus Soule (1827-1887), American lawyer and judge
 Augustus Spencer (1807-1893), British Army officer
 Augustus D. Splivalo (1840-1911), American attorney and politician of Italian descent
 Augustus B. R. Sprague (1827-1910), American businessman, politician, and military figure
 Augustus Stafford (1811-1857), British landowner and politician
 Augustus Owsley Stanley (1867-1958), American politician
 Augustus Stapleton (1800-1880), English biographer and political pamphleteer
 Augustus Steele (1792-1864), American entrepreneur, state legislator, judge, politician, postmaster, port inspector, and tax collector
 Augustus Stinchfield (1842-1917), American physician
 Augustus Stoneman (1832-1905), Canadian merchant and politician
 Augustus Russell Street (1792-1866), American philanthropist
 Augustus N. Summers (1856-1927), American lawyer, politician, and judge
 Augustus Vincent Tack (1870-1949), American painter
 Augustus Joseph Tancred (1804-1867), South African politician
 Augustus Obuadum Tanoh (born 1956), Ghanaian politician and international businessman
 Augustus Gabriel de Vivier Tassin (1842-1893), French-born American Civil War Union Army soldier
 Augustus Tennant (1841-1892), Indian-born New Zealand cricketer
 Augustus Thébaud (1807-1885), French-American educator and publicist
 Augustus Thomas (1857-1934), American playwright
 Augustus Thorndike (1896-1986), American sports physician
 Augustus Toebbe (1829-1884), German-born American Roman Catholic bishop
 Augustus Tolton (1854-1897), American Catholic priest
 Augustus Toplady (1740-1778), English Anglican cleric, hymn writer, animal rights scholar, and poet
 Augustus Edmonds Tozer (1857-1910), English composer and organist
 Augustus Trowbridge (1870-1934), American educator and physicist
 Augustus H. Tulk (1810-1873), Australian librarian and linguist
 Augustus Ulyard (1816-1900), American baker, council member, and politician
 Augustus Uthwatt, Baron Uthwatt (1879-1949), Australian-born British judge
 Augustus Van Dievoet (1803-1865), Belgian legal historian and Supreme Court advocate
 Augustus van Horne Ellis (1827-1863), American lawyer, sea captain, and soldier
 Augustus Van Pelt (1817-1889), American harbor pilot
 Augustus Van Wyck (1850-1922), American judge and politician
 Augustus Arthur Vansittart (1824-1882), English scholar
 Augustus Voelcker (1822-1884), German scientist and chemist
 Augustus Stephen Vogt (1861-1926), German-Canadian organist, choral conductor, music educator, composer, and author
 Augustus Wade Dwight (1827-1865), American Civil War officer and lawyer
 Augustus Walford Weedon (1838-1908), English landscape painter
 Augustus Wall Callcott (1779-1844), English painter
 Augustus Waller, several people
 Augustus Walley (1856-1938), American Army soldier
 Augustus Frederick Warr (1847-1908), English solicitor and politician
 Augustus Washington (c. 1820–1875), American photographer and daguerreotypist
 Augustus Weismann (1809-1884), American politician
 Augustus G. Weissert (1844-1923), American Civil War Union Army soldier
 Augustus West (1814-1887), American abolitionist, landowner, and activist
 Augustus West (priest) (1813-1893), Irish Anglican priest
 Augustus White (1839-?), New Zealand politician
 Augustus A. White (born 1936), American orthopedist, orthopedic surgeon, football player, and lacrosse player
 Augustus Samuel Wilkins (1843-1905), English classical scholar
 Augustus William, Duke of Brunswick-Wolfenbüttel (1662-1731), German prince
 Augustus William, Duke of Brunswick-Wolfenbüttel-Bevern (1715-1781), German military personnel
 Augustus William Hare (1792-1834), British writer
 Augustus William Harvey (1839-1903), British-born Canadian industrialist and politician
 Augustus William Lumley-Savile (1829-1887), English landowner and businessman
 Augustus William Smith (1802-1866), American educator, astronomer, and mathematician
 Augustus Williams (1842-?), American Civil War Navy soldier
 Augustus E. Willson (1846-1931), American politician
 Augustus B. Woodward (1774-1827), American politician of English-Dutch descent
 Augustus Wollaston Franks (1826-1897), British antiquarian and museum administrator
 Augustus B. Wolvin (1857-1932), American shipping magnate
 Augustus Romaldus Wright (1813-1891), American politician, lawyer, and Confederate States Army colonel
 Augustus Young (born 1943), Irish poet
 Augustus Young (representative) (1784-1857), American politician
 Arthur Augustus Zimmerman (1869-1936), American cycling sprint rider
 David Augustus Burke (1952-1987), American hijacker and former employee who caused the crash of Pacific Southwest Airlines Flight 1771
 Henry Augustus Lukeman (1872-1935), American sculptor
 W. Augustus Barratt (1873-1947), Scottish-born American songwriter and musician
 Prince William Augustus, Duke of Cumberland (1721-1765), German-British Army personnel and George II's son

Fictional characters 
 Augustus Cole, a character from the Gears of War series
 Augustus Faverhsam, a character from The Penny Dreadfuls Present...
 Augustus Gloop, a gluttonous character from Charlie and the Chocolate Factory
 Augustus Haynes, character on The Wire
 Lord Augustus Highcastle, a character from Augustus Does His Bit by George Bernard Shaw
 Augustus Hill, narrator and inmate on Oz
 Augustus Porter, a character from the animated fantasy series The Owl House
 Augustus Sinclair, a guiding character from the video game BioShock 2
 Augustus Rookwood, a character from the Harry Potter series
 Augustus Snodgrass, a character in Charles Dickens's novel The Pickwick Papers
 Augustus Waters, a character from The Fault in Our Stars by John Green

See also 
 Arch of Augustus (disambiguation)
 August (name)
 Augusta (disambiguation)
 Augustine (disambiguation)
 Augustus
 Augustus (honorific)
 Temple of Augustus (disambiguation)
 Wars of Augustus

Latin masculine given names